The Parsik Tunnel is a  long electrified dual-line railway tunnel located in Parsik Hill to the east of Thane, Maharashtra. It is a part of the Central line. The west exit of the tunnel is to the southeast of the Kalwa station, while the east exit is to the south of the Mumbra station.

Length and elevation
It is one of the oldest and longest tunnels in India. Trains typically cross the tunnel in 2 minutes.

History
For that purpose, there was need for an alternate route for passing freight trains and passenger trains through Parsik Hill, The GIPR started construction of this tunnel in 1906, it took time 10 years to construct the tunnel and opened at the year 1916.

Whereas the longer route of 9.6 km (6.0 mi) categorized as the slow line of Central line. And also becomes the landmark of a first-mile long tunnel constructed by Indian Railways, during the British period in India.

After the Independence of India, and Incorporation of GIPR into the Central Railway in 1951. The Maintenance work of this tunnel was taken over by Central Railway. 

On 5 May 2018, Central Railway converted the electrified tunnel from 1.5 kV DC to 25 kV 50 Hz AC Overhead line for a smooth ride with less breakdown for the commuters.

New Projects

References

External links
 Milestone of Railways (1916 opening of Parsik tunnel)
 Parsik tunnel (wikimapia)

Railway tunnels in India
Transport in Thane district
Tunnels completed in 1916
1916 establishments in India